USS SP-1595 was a United States Navy patrol vessel in commission during World War I.

Almost no information has been found regarding SP-1595; her name, operational history, and characteristics are unknown. However, a photograph taken at Philadelphia, Pennsylvania, on 15 January 1919 shows a section patrol boat known only as SP-1595 in U.S. Navy service on that date.

Notes

References
NavSource Online: Section Patrol Craft Photo Archive SP 1595

Patrol vessels of the United States Navy
World War I patrol vessels of the United States